The Farfadet class consisted of four submarines built for the French Navy at the beginning of the 20th century designed by Gabriel Maugas. Two boats were lost in diving accidents. All were disposed of prior to the outbreak of the First World War.

Design and description
The Farfadets were designed by Gabriel Maugas, an early French submarine engineer at the Rochefort Naval Dockyard. The Farfadets were single-hulled, and powered by electric motors only, limiting their range and surface performance compared to the contemporary Sirene class. However they had variable-pitch propellers, developed by Maugas, obviating the need for a reversing engine.
 
The submarines displaced  surfaced and  submerged. Their crew numbered 2 officers and 23 enlisted men.

For surface running, the boats were powered by two Sautter-Harlé  diesel engines, each driving one propeller shaft. When submerged each propeller was driven by a 300-metric-horsepower electric motor.

The boats were armed with four internal  torpedo tubes, two in the bow and two in the stern, for which they carried six torpedoes.

Service history
The Farfadets were ordered as part of the French Navy's 1899 building programme, and were constructed over the next three years at the naval dockyards at Rochefort. However they were not successful in service; Farfadet was lost in a diving accident in July 1905, and Lutin in October 1906. Farfadet was raised and recommissioned as Follet, remaining in service until  1911, but the other three vessels were disarmed and converted to other use.

Ships

See also 
List of submarines of France

Notes

References

 
 

 
Submarine classes
Ship classes of the French Navy